Qiang Wei (born March 1953) is a Chinese politician and senior regional official. He is serving as Vice-Chairperson of National People's Congress Internal and Judicial Affairs Committee. Previously, he served as the Communist Party Secretary of Jiangxi province between 2013 and 2016.  He spent much of his earlier political career in Beijing as a key leader of its law-enforcement institutions, including the Beijing Political and Legislative Affairs Commission (Zhengfawei) and the Beijing Public Security Bureau. He also served as the party chief of Qinghai province.

Early life and career
Qiang was born in Wuxi, Jiangsu, in 1953. Qiang Wei joined the Chinese Communist Party in March 1975, and graduated from University of Science and Technology of China with a master's degree in economic management.

Beginning in 1969, when he was only 16, Qiang enlisted in the People's Liberation Army at the military mechanic workshop of a naval base in Fujian province. He served there during much of the Cultural Revolution. He was then employed by Beijing Chemical Engineering Factory and later promoted to deputy head of the sixth laboratory of Beijing Research Institute of Chemical Reagents and later deputy director of the Institute. He subsequently became the CCP Party Chief of Beijing Chemical Engineering Factory.

Political career
In June 1987, he was appointed to lead the Communist Youth League organization in Beijing as its secretary. In December 1990, he became the Communist Party Secretary of Shijingshan District of Beijing (prefecture-level), as well as the chairman of the district's People's Congress. Qiang gained a seat on the Standing Committee of the CCP Beijing Committee in December 1992, and the secretary of Beijing municipal construction commission in January 1993. In March 1994 he became the head of the Beijing Propaganda Department.

In February 1995, Qiang was appointed as the secretary of the Beijing Political and Legal Affairs Commission and the head of the Beijing Public Security Bureau, effectively making him Beijing's police chief. He was awarded the rank of "lieutenant general police commander" in 1995. In March 2001, he was promoted to become Deputy Party Secretary of Beijing.

In January 2006, he became the Secretary of Commission for Discipline Inspection of Beijing, in addition to continuing his role as the Secretary of Beijing Political and Legal Affairs Commission. In March 2007, Qiang took over from Zhao Leji to become the party chief of inland Qinghai province. In March 2013, following the 18th Party Congress, Qiang was transferred to Jiangxi to become its provincial party chief, replacing Su Rong. In 2014 Su Rong was detained for a corruption investigation. In June 2016, Qiang departed from his post as party chief of Jiangxi.

On 2 July 2016, Qiang was appointed as Vice-Chairperson of National People's Congress Internal and Judicial Affairs Committee.

Qiang was an alternate member of 16th Central Committee of the Chinese Communist Party, and a member of the 17th and 18th Central Committees.

References

1953 births
Living people
Politicians from Wuxi
People's Republic of China politicians from Jiangsu
Chinese Communist Party politicians from Jiangsu
Political office-holders in Qinghai
Political office-holders in Jiangxi
Chinese police officers